The Men's 50 metre freestyle S2 swimming event at the 2004 Summer Paralympics was competed on 25 September. It was won by James Anderson, representing .

1st round

Heat 1
25 September 2004, morning session

Heat 2
25 September 2004, morning session

Final round

25 September 2004, evening session

References

M